Tiago dos Reis Xavier Serralheiro (born 20 March 1997) is a Portuguese professional footballer who plays for Gondomar as a forward.

Football career
On 29 December 2015, Serralheiro made his professional debut with Paços Ferreira in a 2014–15 Taça da Liga match against Sporting.

References

External links

Stats and profile at LPFP 

1997 births
Living people
Portuguese footballers
Association football forwards
F.C. Paços de Ferreira players
Gondomar S.C. players
Sportspeople from Portalegre District